Mexico tropical cyclone rainfall climatology discusses precipitation characteristics of tropical cyclones that have struck Mexico over the years.  One-third of the annual rainfall received along the Mexican Riviera and up to half of the rainfall received in Baja California Sur is directly attributable to tropical cyclones moving up the west coast of Mexico.  The central plateau is shielded from the high rainfall amounts seen on the oceanward slopes of the Sierra Madre Oriental and Occidental mountain chains.

General characteristics

Storms track near and along the western Mexican coastline primarily between the months of July and September.  These storms enhance the monsoon circulation over northwest Mexico and the southwest United States.  On an average basis, eastern Pacific tropical cyclones contribute about one-third of the annual rainfall along the Mexican Riviera, and up to one-half of the rainfall seen annually across Baja California Sur.  Mexico is twice as likely (18% of the basin total) to be impacted by a Pacific tropical cyclone on its west coast than an Atlantic tropical cyclone on its east coast (9% of the basin total).  The three most struck states in Mexico in the 50 years at the end of the 20th century were Baja California Sur, Sinaloa, and Quintana Roo.

Highest known rainfall amounts

Below is a list of the top ten highest known storm total rainfall amounts from individual tropical cyclones across Mexico.  Most of the rainfall information was provided by the Mexico's National Weather Service, Servicio Meteorológico Nacional, which is a part of the National Water Commission, Comisión Nacional del Agua.

Maximum tropical cyclone rainfall per state for Mexico

On the western side of Mexico, the Sierra Madre Occidental keeps the central plateau free of excessive rainfall, as tropical cyclones originating in the Eastern Pacific Ocean rain themselves out on the upslope sides of the topography. On the eastern side of Mexico, the Sierra Madre Oriental has the same orographic effect, this time blocking tropical disturbances making landfall from the Gulf of Mexico. State maxima relating to tropical cyclones and their remnants are shown on the right, color-coded by amount.

See also
List of wettest tropical cyclones by country
Tropical cyclone
Tropical cyclone rainfall climatology
Tropical cyclone rainfall forecasting

References

External links
Individual Tropical Cyclone Rainfall Pages for North America
SOI and PDO relation to tropical cyclone rainfall variability in Mexico
Characteristics of Landfalling Tropical Cyclones in the United States and Mexico: Climatology and Interannual Variability

Tropical cyclone meteorology